Seyyed Mohammad Nazemasharieh (born 22 September 1969) is an Iranian professional futsal coach and former player. He is currently head coach of Iraq national futsal team.

Honours

National
 Third-place, FIFA Futsal World Cup, 2016
 Champions, AFC Futsal Championship, 2016 ; 2018
 Runners-up, Grand Prix de Futsal, 2015
 Champions, Futsal at the 2017 Asian Indoor and Martial Arts Games

References

1969 births
Living people
People from Shiraz
Iranian men's futsal players
Iranian futsal coaches
Sadra Shiraz FSC players
Iran national futsal team managers
Giti Pasand FSC managers
Sportspeople from Fars province